Glutophrissa is a genus of butterflies in the family Pieridae. There is at least one described species in Glutophrissa, G. drusilla.

References

Further reading

 

Pierini
Pieridae genera